Gaskaminjan (also Romanized as Gaskamīnjān; also known as Gasgamīnjān and Gīsgamīn Jān) is a village in Shanderman Rural District, Shanderman District, Masal County, Gilan Province, Iran. At the 2006 census, its population was 558, in 126 families.

References 

Populated places in Masal County